Life's Whirlpool is a 1917 American silent drama film written and directed by Lionel Barrymore with his sister Ethel Barrymore as the star. This is the brother and sister's only collaboration on a silent film as director and star.

This film should not be confused with Life's Whirlpool (also known as McTeague), the first film adaptation of Frank Norris's McTeague.

The Lionel Barrymore directed film was produced by B. A. Rolfe and released through Metro Pictures. Barrymore would return for a short time to directing films in the early sound era. This is now considered to be a lost film.

Plot
As described in a film magazine, Esther (Barrymore), upon the death of her father, is advised by her kindly neighbors to get married. She is forced to sell the homestead and marries a domineering old miser named John Martin (Carrington), who lives with his maiden sister Ruth (Allen). Because she passes the time of day on the street with young men, her husband becomes jealous. He chokes her after he finds a letter from a former friend, Dr. Henry Grey (Hale), and she decides to leave him. While escaping with her son she is detained in a hut by a drunken farmer who tries to embrace her. She shoots him dead, and a posse arrests her for the death of her husband, who was found strangled in the library. However, the death confession of the real murderer clears her of her husband's death, and the return of her former friend from France completes her happiness.

Cast
Ethel Barrymore - Esther Carey
Paul Everton - B.J. Hendrix
Alan Hale - Dr. Henry Grey
Reginald Carrington - John Martin
Ricca Allen - Ruth Martin
Frank Leigh - Dirk Kansket
Walter Hiers - Fatty Holmes
Harvey Bogart - Ezra Craddock

Reception
Like many American films of the time, Life's Whirlpool was subject to cuts by city and state film censorship boards. The Chicago Board of Censors required that three choking scenes be shortened.

See also
Lionel Barrymore filmography
List of lost films

References

External links

Progressive Silent Film List: Life's Whirlpool at silentera.com

kinotv.com

1917 films
American silent feature films
Films based on short fiction
Films directed by Lionel Barrymore
Lost American films
1917 drama films
American black-and-white films
Films with screenplays by Lionel Barrymore
Silent American drama films
1917 lost films
Lost drama films
1910s American films